Khürelbaataryn is a Mongolian patronymic. Notable people with this patronymic include:

Khürelbaataryn Bulgantuya (born 1981), Mongolian politician
Khürelbaataryn Enkhtuya (born 1990), Mongolian parataekwondo practitioner
Khürelbaataryn Khash-Erdene (born 1983), Mongolian cross-country skier
Khürelbaataryn Tsend-Ayuush (born 1990), Mongolian footballer

Mongolian-language patronymics